The Rothaar Mountains (also Rotlagergebirge), or Rothaar, is a low mountain range reaching heights of up to 843.1 m in North Rhine-Westphalia and Hesse, Germany.

It is believed that its name must once have been Rod-Hard-Gebirge, or "the cleared forest mountain range", as the range has nothing whatsoever to do with the colour red (rot in German), nor with hair (Haar).

Geography

Location 
The thickly wooded Rothaar, rich in mineral deposits, is found (mostly) in Westphalia sandwiched between the Sauerland Mountain Range to the north, the Upland mountain range (northeastern foothills of the Rothaar) to the northeast, Wittgenstein Land to the southeast and the Siegerland to the southwest.  The range's southeastern foothills are lies in Hesse, and is the only part that lies outside of Westphalia. It stretches from the upper Eder and the Lenne from the Kahler Asten (841 m) southwest of the Winterberg Tableland (Winterberger Hochfläche) some 30 km to the southwest and drops off steeply towards the west, but much less sharply towards the east.

The Rothaar is a narrow, banklike mountain chain, mostly over 600 m forming a large part of the Rhine Massif (Rheinisches Schiefergebirge). The highest peak in the Rothgaar Mountains is the Langenberg at 843.1 m.  The elevation of other mountains in the area are only slightly lower so that the individual mountains that make up the range ' hardly stand out from each other.

The Rothaar Mountains are more or less co-extensive with the Rothaar Mountain Nature Park, parts of which do, however, reach into adjacent areas.

Bodies of water 

In the northern Rothaar rise, among others, the rivers Diemel, Lenne, Neger, Nuhne, Odeborn, Orke, Ruhr, Wenne and Wilde Aa. In the south rise the Dill, Eder, Ferndorfbach, Ilse, Lahn and Sieg. Over the range runs the Rhine-Weser watershed. In the farthest southwest of the Rothaar are the Obernau and Breitenbach dams.

Mountains 
Among the best known (but not necessarily the highest) of the Rothaar's peaks, which consist partly of porphyry, are (including all "Achthunderter", or "eight-hundreders", sorted by height):

The German Wikipedia has a more exhaustive list of the Rothaar's many peaks.

Places 
In the Rothaar Mountains and/or the Rothaar Mountain Nature Park or their outskirts are found, among others, these municipalities:

Activities 

Many hiking trails run through the Rothaar Mountains, among others the Rothaar Path, a 154 km-long trail through the heights, and the Waldskulpturenweg ("Forest Sculpture Way") along which are found various sculptures and other artworks by different artists.

In winter, many sporting opportunities beckon visitors to the range. Suitable facilities for this include the Postwiesen skiing area (near Neuastenberg), the Skiliftkarussell Winterberg and Snow World Züschen.

Within or on the outskirts of the Rothaar are found the Panorama-Park Sauerland and Fort Fun Abenteuerland amusement parks.

Free-ranging wisents
In 2011 began the reintroduction of free-ranging wisents into the Rothaar Mountains. The project is, however, not without its controversy in the region, with cultivators in particular worrying about possible damage that the creatures might do.

References

External links 

 Rothaar Mountain Region
 Rothaarsteig 
 Waldskulpturenweg

 
Mountain ranges of North Rhine-Westphalia
Regions of Hesse
Mountain ranges of Hesse
Natural regions of the Süder Uplands